Sebastian C. Adams (1825–1898) served as county clerk and as State Senator while living in Yamhill County, Oregon.

Bibliography
 Chronological Chart of Ancient, Modern and Biblical History (1871)

References

1825 births
1898 deaths
Oregon state senators
People from Yamhill County, Oregon
Place of birth missing
19th-century American politicians